Bupleurum  tenuissimum, the slender hare's-ear, is a coastal plant of the family Apiaceae.

References

tenuissimum
Plants described in 1753
Taxa named by Carl Linnaeus